Cascio is an Italian surname. Notable people with the surname include:

Anna Theresa Cascio (born 1955), American writer
Bubba Cascio (born 1932), American racehorse trainer
Jamais Cascio, American writer
Jason Cascio (born 1985), American soccer player
Pasquale Cascio (born 1957), Italian Roman Catholic archbishop
Salvatore Cascio (born 1979), Italian actor
Tony Cascio (born 1990), American soccer player
Wayne Cascio, American economist

See also
Cascio tracks, several posthumous songs by Michael Jackson that are alleged to have been recorded by the Cascio family

Italian-language surnames